List of English football transfers 2010–11 may refer to:

List of English football transfers summer 2010
List of English football transfers winter 2010–11
List of English football transfers summer 2011

Transfers
2010